Ricardo Toledo Carranza  (born September 23, 1958, in Pavas) is a Costa Rican politician.

References

1958 births
Living people
Costa Rican politicians
People from San José Province